Felipe Andreoli (born March 7, 1980) is a Brazilian musician best known as the bassist for the heavy metal band Angra. 

Andreoli first started playing the bass at age 13, when a school band needed a bass player. After joining Angra at age 20, he started an international career, recording albums and touring. He is also a music instructor, currently having online courses.

Andreoli plays Ibanez SR and BTB basses with D'Addario strings and Aguilar amps.

Discography

Di'Anno
 Nomad (2000)

Angra
 Rebirth (2001)
 Hunters and Prey (2002)
 Rebirth World Tour - Live in São Paulo (2003)
 Temple of Shadows (2004)
 Aurora Consurgens (2006)
 Aqua (2010)
 Angels Cry 20th Anniversary Tour (2013)
 Secret Garden (2014)
 Ømni (2018)

Karma
 Inside the Eyes (2000)
 Leave Now!!! (2005)

FireSign
 The Top Of The Mountain (2000)

Vox
 Original (2006)

Freakeys
 Freakeys (2006)

Time Out
 The Journey (2008)

Almah
 Fragile Equality (2008)
 Motion (2011)

Kiko Loureiro
 Fullblast (2008)
 Sounds of Innocence (2012)
 The White Balance (2013)
 Open Source  (2020)

Bittencourt Project
 Brainworms I (2008)

4Action
 Live In San Francisco (2013)
 Live In São Paulo at Mosh Studios (2018)

One Arm Away
 Carpe Ludus (2016)

Rec/All
 Rec/All (2017)

Other participations
 Alirio Netto - Joao de Deus (2016)
 Marcelo Barbosa - Nego (2019)
 Paulo Schroeber - Freak Songs (2011)
 Rafael Nery - My Heaven (2014)
 Lari Basilio – Golden (2011)
 Vivaldi Metal Project - The Four Seasons (2016)
 Mello Jr. - Reflections (2019)
 Indireto - Lesf!! (2011)
 Sevencrows - Deep Thoughts (2020)
 Furia Inc. - Murder Narture (2014)
 Eduardo Lira - The First Concept Project (2016)
 Lucas Bittencourt - Lucas Bittencourt (2012)	
 Nenel Lucena - Inside My Head (2015)
 Samuel Zechin - Back On The Road (2014)
 Metris - The Beginning (2020)
 Krusader - Battle Memories (2016)

References

External links
  Official Site

Living people
1980 births
Brazilian heavy metal bass guitarists
Male bass guitarists
Angra (band) members
Brazilian people of Italian descent
Musicians from São Paulo
21st-century bass guitarists
21st-century male musicians
Almah (band) members